Tillandsia gerdae is a species in the genus Tillandsia. This species is endemic to Bolivia.

References

gerdae
Flora of Bolivia